Elephant Butte may refer to:

Summits
 Elephant Butte (Hidalgo County, New Mexico) 
 Elephant Butte (Sierra County, New Mexico), a volcanic neck surrounded by a lake
 Elephant Butte (Montana), a mountain in Garfield County
 Elephant Butte (Arches National Park), highest point in Arches National Park
 Elephant Butte (Washington), a mountain in Whatcom County

Other places
 Elephant Butte Reservoir, a reservoir on the Rio Grande, in New Mexico.
 Elephant Butte, New Mexico, a city
 Elephant Butte, Sierra County, New Mexico, a populated place

See also
White Elephant Butte